Le Mars Municipal Airport  is a city-owned public-use airport located  southwest of the central business district of Le Mars, a city in Plymouth County, Iowa, United States.

Facilities and aircraft
It has one runway designated 18/36 with a concrete surface measuring 4,605 by 75 feet (1,404 x 23 m).

For the 12-month period ending April 17, 2008, the airport had 10,780 aircraft operations, an average of 29 per day: 99.5% general aviation and  0.5% military. In March 2017, there were 24 aircraft based at this airport: 17 single-engine, 2 jet and 5 ultralight.

References

External links
 Aerial photo from USGS The National Map
 

Le Mars, Iowa
Airports in Iowa
Transportation buildings and structures in Plymouth County, Iowa